The Odd Fellows Home of Dell Rapids, also known as the I.O.O.F. Home, is a historic Independent Order of Odd Fellows lodge and former orphanage in Dell Rapids, South Dakota. It was listed on the National Register of Historic Places in 2012, with four contributing resources: the main building, a power plant, the front gate, and an apple orchard.

References

External links
 

		
National Register of Historic Places in Minnehaha County, South Dakota
Residential buildings completed in 1910
1910 establishments in South Dakota
Odd Fellows buildings in South Dakota
Orphanages in the United States